Tom Guerra is an American guitarist, songwriter, and vintage guitar preservationist. He has been a member of Mambo Sons and Dirty Bones Band, has appeared as a guest on recordings by other notable artists, and has released albums under his own name.

Career
Guerra began his music career in the late 1970s, playing in the New England club circuit with blues and rock acts. His primary influences include Rory Gallagher, Paul Kossoff, Jimmy Page, Keith Richards, Ronnie Wood, Muddy Waters, Buddy Guy, and Joe Walsh. In the 1980s, Guerra recorded with Rick Derringer, Max Weinberg, Guitar Shorty, Kenny Aaronson, and many others. From 1983 to 1992 Guerra was a member of the garage rock group Dirty Bones Band and recorded four albums with them. He was profiled in Guitar Player magazine in 1991. He started writing for Vintage Guitar Magazine in 1998 and continues to do so to the present day. His column focuses on authentic recording techniques and collecting vintage guitars. Guerra has also received many endorsements from guitar companies including Brian Moore Custom guitars, plus effects and amplifier companies like DST-Engineering. In 1999 Guerra formed the band Mambo Sons with longtime collaborator Scott Lawson. That band released four albums, receiving several "album of the year" accolades from publications like NYRock magazine and Modern Guitars magazine, while Lawson was invited to serve as artist-in-residence at the Wallace Stegner house.

In 2009 and 2013, at the request of Johnny Winter, Guerra wrote the liner notes for Winters' series of live albums entitled The Bootleg Series. When Mambo Sons went on hiatus in 2012, Guerra shifted to songwriting, studio session work, and production, as well as working on solo recordings. He also turned to topical songwriting: his 2012 song "Love Comes to Us All" addressed the Sandy Hook Elementary School shooting and was praised by several Connecticut politicians. In 2013, he recorded "Put Up Their Names - The Ballad of the U.S.S. Frank E. Evans" to honor the 74 sailors lost aboard the  naval disaster off the coast of Vietnam in June 1969. According to Guerra, the purpose of the song is to bring attention to the U.S. Government's refusal to list the names of those 74 servicemen on the Vietnam Veterans Memorial. His first solo album All of the Above was released in 2014, followed by Trampling Out the Vintage in 2016, and American Garden in 2018. The latter album included several songs that Guerra had been invited to write for a Yardbirds reunion album that was ultimately shelved.

In 2020, in the midst of the worldwide Covid-19 pandemic, Guerra released his fourth solo album entitled Sudden Signs of Grace. Guerra said he felt compelled to release it now because "people need music, especially during times like these." In a review of Sudden Signs of Grace, The Big Takeover commended Guerra by stating it's "his best album to date...gorgeous." The video for the title track features guest appearances from a number of rock notables, including Hilton Valentine, Dan Baird, Christine Ohlman, G.E. Smith, Alvin Youngblood Hart, Jeff Pevar, Kenny Aaronson and Morgan Fisher.

In March 2022, "Sentimental Junk," Guerra's fifth solo album was released on the Thin Man Music label, featuring the single "California's Got to My Girl," a duet with Jon Butcher, and also featuring Mike Kosacek on drums, Morgan Fisher and Matt Zeiner on keys, and Kenny Aaronson on bass.  A Newsweek podcast called the release "Capturing Lightning in a Bottle."

Guerra has been praised for his commitment to songwriting: in a review of his 2016 album, American Songwriter said, "Guerra has honed his songwriting homework... All in all, the record is that rarity in the rock world: eclectic but never unfocused." In a review of the 2018 album, Vents magazine praised Guerra's mastery of many musical styles by stating, "Tom Guerra is not just a great rocker. He needs a new title or diagnosis. Considering his extraordinary eclecticism, maybe we should call what he has Multiple Musical Personality Disorder." Guerra has also been noted for his commitment to the preservation of vintage guitars and recording techniques.

Solo and band discography
Exhumed - Dirty Bones Band (1983)
Last Remains  - Dirty Bones Band (1986)
new wOrld disOrder - Dirty Bones Band (1991)
Stronger Than Dirt - Dirty Bones Band (1993)
Mambo Sons - Mambo Sons (1999)
Play Some Rock & Roll - Mambo Sons (2003)
Mr. Positive - Jeff Keithline (2004)
Racket of Three - Mambo Sons (2005)
Heavy Days - Mambo Sons (2009)
All of the Above - Tom Guerra (2014)
Trampling Out the Vintage - Tom Guerra (2016)
American Garden - Tom Guerra (2018)
360 Degrees - Jon Butcher (2019)
Sudden Signs of Grace - Tom Guerra (2020)
Sentimental Junk - Tom Guerra (2022)

References

External links
 "Sentimental Junk" - Tom Guerra solo album
 "Sudden Signs of Grace" - Tom Guerra solo album
 "American Garden" - Tom Guerra solo album
 "Trampling Out the Vintage" - Tom Guerra solo album
 "All of the Above" - Tom Guerra solo album
 Mambo Sons
 Tom Guerra's Interviews with Great Guitarists
 Tom Guerra on Myspace
 Modern Guitars Interview with Tom Guerra
 ToneQuest Interview with Tom Guerra (pdf)

American blues guitarists
American rhythm and blues guitarists
American male guitarists
American rock guitarists
1963 births
Living people
20th-century American guitarists
20th-century American male musicians